Rojan may refer to:
 Rojan, Iran, a village in Kerman Province
 Rojan (musician), Iranian Classical musician (Kurdish and Persian Traditional Music)
 A pen name often used by Feodor Stepanovich Rojankovsky, an illustrator of children's books and erotica
 A Star Trek character in the episode By Any Other Name

See also 
Rojahn, a surname